Cornwall was the name of a provincial electoral district that elected one member to the Legislative Assembly of Ontario, Canada. It existed from 1867 to 1886, when it was redistributed into Cornwall and Stormont, and from 1975 to 1999 when it was abolished into Stormont—Dundas—Charlottenburgh. It consisted of the city of Cornwall, the Township of Cornwall and the Township of Charlottenburgh.

MPPs

1867-1886
 John Sandfield Macdonald, Conservative (1867-1872)
 John Goodall Snetsinger, Liberal (1872-1875)
 Alexander Fraser McIntyre, Conservative (1875)
 John Goodall Snetsinger, Liberal (1875-1879)
 William Mack, Liberal (1879-1883)
 Alexander Peter Ross, Conservative (1883-1886)

1975-1999
 George Samis, New Democratic Party (1975-1985)
 Luc Guindon, Progressive Conservative (1985-1987)
 John Cleary, Liberal (1987-1999)

References 

Former provincial electoral districts of Ontario